Ludwig Müller (1883–1945) was a German theologian

Ludwig Müller may also refer to:

 Ludwig Müller (general) (1892–1972), German World War II general
 Ludwig Müller (runner) (1932–2022), German Olympic athlete
 Ludwig Müller (footballer) (1941–2021) German international football player

See also 
 Ludvig Müller (1868–1922), Norwegian actor